KJSO may refer to:

 KJSO-LP, a low-power radio station (101.3 FM) licensed to serve Omaha, Nebraska, United States
 Cherokee County Airport (Texas) (ICAO code KJSO)